Signal fire can refer to:

Fire used as a light signal, a beacon that can be seen from a distance.
 Phryctoria
 Byzantine beacon system
A smoke signal
"Signal Fire" (song), a 2007 song by Snow Patrol
"Signal Fire", a song by Erra from their 2018 album Neon